Hwa-Om-Kyung (also known as Passage to Buddha) is a 1993 South Korean film written and directed by Jang Sun-woo. It is an adaptation of the famous Mahayana sutra, Avatamsaka Sutra.

Plot
The film presents a Buddhist-themed story of a boy searching for his mother who abandoned him as a baby, and the characters he meets on his journey.

Cast
Oh Tae-kyung as Seon-jae
Won Mi-kyung as Lady of lotus
Lee Ho-jae as Beob-un
Lee Hye-young as Ma-ni
Kim Hye-sun as I-ryeon
Lee Dae-ro as Lighthouse keeper
Dokgo Young-jae as Hae-un
Shin Hyun-joon as Ji-ho
Jeong Soo-young as I-na
Um Chun-bae as Deok-ku

Awards

Wins
44th Berlin International Film Festival (1994), Alfred Bauer Prize

Nominations
Berlin International Film Festival (1994), Golden Berlin Bear

References

Bibliography

External links

1990s Korean-language films
South Korean drama films
Films directed by Jang Sun-woo